The 1919 North Carolina State Aggies football team represented the NC State Aggies of North Carolina State University during the 1919 college football season.  A year after losing to Georgia Tech 128 to 0, the Aggies achieve their largest win margin in program history, a 100–0 shutout of Hampton Roads Navy, one of the many highlights of NC State's turnaround 1919 season. NC State went 3–1 against conference opponents, playing North Carolina for the first time since 1905, and losing by a single point. For the first time, NC State achieved a seven-win season, which was not surpassed until 1927.

Schedule

References

NC State
NC State Wolfpack football seasons
NC State Aggies football